Serve & Collect is the second studio album by American hip hop group Boss Hogg Outlawz. It was released on February 27, 2007 via Boss Hogg Outlawz/Koch Records.

The album found minor success on the Billboard charts, peaking at number 63 on the Billboard 200 and number 10 on the Top R&B/Hip-Hop Albums. The album's lead single "Woodgrain Wheel" was a minor hit on the R&B/Hip singles chart. The album was followed by two sequels, Back by Blockular Demand: Serve & Collect II in 2008 and Serve & Collect III in 2011.

Track listing

Sample credits
"Recognize a Playa" contains elements from "Ace of Spade" by O.V. Wright

Personnel
Stayve Jerome Thomas – performer (tracks: 1-4, 6, 9-10, 12, 14, 17-18), executive producer
Perthy Carson – performer (tracks: 2-3, 7, 9-11, 14-15, 18)
Chris Ward – performer (tracks: 3, 8-9, 11, 14, 16, 18)
Kyle Jeroderrick Riley – performer (tracks: 5-7, 15-17)
T. Harris – performer (tracks: 2-3, 6, 16-17)
Larry Wayne Jones, Jr. – performer (tracks: 4, 7, 10, 15)
S. Witfield – performer (tracks: 9, 13)
Rob Smallz – performer (track 12)
Leroy Williams, Jr. – producer (tracks: 1-3, 6, 8-11, 14-15), mixing (tracks: 2-3, 8-11, 14-15)
Terry Keith Allen – producer (tracks: 1, 5, 7, 12), mixing (tracks: 1, 5-7, 12)
GL Productions – producer & mixing (track 13)
Fly – mixing (track 4)
Raymond Thomas – executive producer
Mike Frost – artwork & design
Fabian "Fabo" Martinez - Audio Engineer

Chart history

References

External links

 

2007 albums
E1 Music albums
Slim Thug albums
Boss Hogg Outlawz albums